Sydney Coachlines is an Australian bus charter company in Sydney.

History
On 27 March 1983, Thomas "Dick" Crow trading as Sydney Coachlines took over route 49 Rockdale - Carlton from John Brown and Bob Stevens. In April 1985, route 6 Arncliffe - Earlwood was purchased from Highway Tours and by December 1985, had been extended from Arncliffe to Rockdale to become Rockdale - Arncliffe - Earlwood. On 14 October 1987, route 68 Hurstville - Earlwood was purchased from Canterbury Bus Lines.

Sydney Coachlines also commenced a coach charter business, initially operating ex Ansett Pioneer RFWs. On 14 October 1996, the three routes were sold to Sydney Buses. Route 6 was amalgamated with parts of route 472 to become route 471, while route 68 was renumbered 499. Route 49 passed to Pioneer Coaches.

Fleet
As at September 2014, the fleet consisted of nine buses and three coaches. The original fleet livery was two-tone green, later being replaced by a white, purple and aqua scheme.

Depots
Sydney Coachlines initially operated out of a shared depot in Bexley, before relocating to Kingsgrove in 1993.

References

External links
Company website

Bus companies of New South Wales
Bus transport in Sydney
Transport companies established in 1985
1985 establishments in Australia